Monoxenus elongatus is a species of beetle in the family Cerambycidae. It was described by Stephan von Breuning in 1939.

It's 16 mm long and 6 mm wide, and its type locality is Mount Meru, Tanzania.

Subspecies
 Monoxenus elongatus elongatus Breuning, 1939
 Monoxenus elongatus ngorongorensis Breuning, 1960

References

elongatus
Beetles described in 1939
Taxa named by Stephan von Breuning (entomologist)